Arcinella cornuta, or the Florida spiny jewelbox clam , is a marine species of bivalve mollusc in the family Chamidae. It can be found along the coast of North Carolina to Florida, Gulf of Mexico, Caribbean Central America, and Venezuela.

Description

The shell of A. cornuta is quadrangular to obliquely trigonal. It attaches itself to surfaces during its early growth stage, after that it is free-living. The shell features seven to nine radial rows of pleated radial ribs covered by large spines with coarse pitting between ribs. The exterior is a creamy white color with the interior being white with flushed pink and/or yellow coloration. The typical habitat is that of coral reefs.

References

Chamidae
Molluscs described in 1866